The 2021–22 Incarnate Word Cardinals men's basketball team represented the University of the Incarnate Word during the 2021–22 NCAA Division I men's basketball season. The Cardinals were led by fourth-year head coach Carson Cunningham and played their home games at McDermott Convocation Center in San Antonio, Texas as members of the Southland Conference. They finished the season 7–25, 3–11 in Southland play to finish in last place. They lost in the first round of the Southland tournament to Houston Baptist.

Previous season 
In a season limited due to the ongoing COVID-19 pandemic, the Cardinals finished the 2020–21 season 8–14, 5–9 in Southland play to finish in eighth place. They lost Houston Baptist in the first round of the Southland tournament.

Roster

Schedule and results

|-
!colspan=9 style=| Non-conference Regular season

|-
!colspan=9 style=| Southland Regular season

|-
!colspan=9 style=| Southland tournament

Source:

References

Incarnate Word Cardinals men's basketball seasons
Incarnate Word
Incarnate Word Cardinals men's basketball
Incarnate Word Cardinals men's basketball